The Embassy of the United Kingdom in Paris is the chief diplomatic mission of the United Kingdom in France. It is located on one of the most famous streets in France, rue du Faubourg Saint-Honoré in the 8th arrondissement of Paris. The current British Ambassador to France is Menna Rawlings. The embassy also represents the British Overseas Territories in France.

There are British consulates in Bordeaux and Marseille.

History
During World War II and the Nazi occupation of France, the embassy's archives were burned as its staff fled the building to go south with the civilian Vichy regime from 1940 to 1944 to escape the German military, placing it under Swiss protection in the meantime.

Ambassador's Residence

The official residence of the British ambassador to France since 1814 has been the Hôtel de Charost, located at 39 rue du Faubourg Saint-Honoré, just a few doors down from the Élysée Palace. It was built in 1720 and bought by the Duke of Wellington in 1814. Napoleon's sister, Princess Borghese, joined her brother in exile to Elba, an italian island located near the coasts of Tuscany. Penury forced the sale of this jewel looking house on rue du Faubourg Saint-Honoré to the British government for use as their embassy. It had been the home of the Duke of Wellington for 5 months because he had been appointed Britain's ambassador to the court of Louis XVIII.

See also
France-United Kingdom relations
List of diplomatic missions in France
List of ambassadors of the United Kingdom to France
Embassy of France, London

References

Paris
United Kingdom
Buildings and structures in the 8th arrondissement of Paris
France–United Kingdom relations